Mallonia granulata is a species of beetle in the family Cerambycidae. It was described by William Lucas Distant in 1892. It is known from South Africa.

References

Pachystolini
Beetles described in 1892
Taxa named by William Lucas Distant